Manuel Jorquera (born 12 June 1978) is a former professional tennis player from Italy.

Biography
Jorquera comes from Argentina originally, born and raised in Bahía Blanca until the age of 11, when he moved to Italy.

Throughout his career he battled many injuries as he competed on the Satellite and Challenger circuits.

He is the highest ranked player to ever beat Novak Djokovic in a professional match, which he did at a Satellite tournament in Serbia and Montenegro in 2003, the Serbian's first month on tour.

In doubles he won two Challenger titles and was runner-up in a further 14 tournaments. It was in doubles that he had only main draw appearance on the ATP Tour, at the 2004 Croatia Open Umag, where he partnered with Victor Hănescu.

Since retiring he spent a year as the director of Tennis Club Este, then in 2013 moved to China to coach the country's junior talent.

Challenger titles

Doubles: (2)

References

External links
 
 

1978 births
Living people
Italian male tennis players
Argentine emigrants to Italy
Sportspeople from Bahía Blanca
Naturalised citizens of Italy
Naturalised tennis players